The 1977 World trials season consisted of twelve trials events. It began on 12 February, with round one in Newtownards, Ireland and ended with round twelve in Oberiberg, Switzerland on 25 September.

Season summary
Yrjo Vesterinen would claim his second World trials championship in 1977, repeating his 1976 title.

1977 World trials season calendar

Scoring system
Points were awarded to the top ten finishers. All twelve rounds counted for the World Trials class.

World Trials final standings

{|
|

References

1977 in motorcycle sport